This page shows the results of the Racquetball Competition for men and women at the 2003 Pan American Games, held from August 1 to August 17, 2003 in Santo Domingo, Dominican Republic.

Men's competition

Singles

Doubles

Women's competition

Singles

Doubles

Medal table

References
 Sports 123

2003 in racquetball
2003
Events at the 2003 Pan American Games
Racquetball in the Dominican Republic